Robin Hughes  (born Eleanor Robin Hughes) is an Australian filmmaker, producer and writer. She was Pro-Chancellor of the Australian National University from 2014 until 2017.

Early life 
Hughes was born in Sydney, and attended Fort Street High School. She received a BA in Psychology from the University of Sydney.

Career 
Hughes started her career in London as a producer for BBC Radio before moving back to Sydney to join ABC Radio's newly-formed Science Unit. She was head of Film Australia from 1985–1989, where she restructured the entire company and established the first animation unit. She went on to produce a number of award-winning documentaries for television, including Australians with Mike Willesee. From 1991-1997 she served as Chair of the Council of the Australian Film, Television and Radio School. From 1992 until 2007 she was the writer and interviewer for Australian Biography, an archival project and television series produced by Screen Australia that aired on SBS television, and included interviews with some of Australia's most important thinkers, entertainers, artists and musicians, including Nugget Coombs, Smoky Dawson, Thomas Keneally, Malcolm Fraser and Donald Horne. Hughes wrote a book based on the series, entitled Australian Lives, published by Angus & Robertson. In 2012 she wrote, presented and co-produced a follow-up television series, Creative Minds, which included interviews with Geoffrey Rush, Kate Grenville and Bill Henson and also aired on SBS. Hughes has acted as Chair on the boards of several performing arts companies, including Performing Lines and Bangarra Dance Theatre. In 2019, Hughes earned a doctorate in Creative Writing from Macquarie University. She was made an Officer of the Order of Australia for services to film and broadcasting in 1993. She won the Stanley Hawes Award for contributions to Australian documentary-making at the 2004 Australian International Documentary Conference.

Personal life 
Hughes is married to cultural economist David Throsby and lives in Hunters Hill, Sydney.

References 

Living people
Year of birth missing (living people)
Officers of the Order of Australia
Australian filmmakers
Australian National University people
People from Sydney
University of Sydney alumni
Macquarie University alumni